Baltic Cup is a figure skating competition held in Poland. In some years, it has been held as part of the ISU Junior Grand Prix circuit. In years when it is not part of the Junior Grand Prix, it is held as an independent international competition at the junior and novice levels.

External links
2008/2009 results
2006/2007 results
2005/2006 results (JGP)
2004/2005 results
2003/2004 results (JGP)

Figure skating competitions